Mahendra Baitha (born 22 January 1928) was an Indian politician who was elected to the Lower House of Indian Parliament the Lok Sabha from Bagaha, Bihar in 1989 and 1991 as a member of the Janata Dal and in 1996, 1998 and 1999 as a Samata Party (now led by Uday Mandal its President) member.

References

External links
Official biographical sketch in Parliament of India website

India MPs 1989–1991
India MPs 1991–1996
India MPs 1996–1997
India MPs 1998–1999
India MPs 1999–2004
Lok Sabha members from Bihar
1928 births
2005 deaths
Janata Dal politicians
Samata Party politicians